Skyros Island National Airport  is an airport serving the island of Skyros in Greece. It is located 17 km northwards from the town of the island (also called Skyros), in an area called Trachi. It opened in 1984 and since then it operates as a civil airport.

Airlines and destinations
The following airlines operate regular scheduled and charter flights at Skyros Island Airport:

Statistics

See also
Transport in Greece

References

Airports in Greece
Skyros
Transport infrastructure in Central Greece